Foul Play is an American drama series that aired from January 26 until August 23, 1981 on ABC. The series was based on the 1978 film of the same name, and retained many of the same characterizations, as well as the San Francisco setting of the film. The lead roles played by Goldie Hawn and Chevy Chase in the film were taken over by Deborah Raffin and Barry Bostwick, respectively, in the series. The series was produced by Thomas L. Miller (who co-produced the film), Robert L. Boyett and Hal Sitowitz, under Paramount Television.

Premise
Based on the 1978 film of the same name, the series is about a bumbling detective in San Francisco and his girlfriend.

Cast
Deborah Raffin as Gloria Munday
Barry Bostwick as Detective Tucker Pendleton
Richard Romanus as Captain Vito Lombardi
Greg Rice as Ben
John Rice as Beau
Mary Jo Catlett as Stella

Episodes

References

External links

1981 American television series debuts
1981 American television series endings
1980s American crime drama television series
English-language television shows
American Broadcasting Company original programming
Live action television shows based on films
Television shows set in San Francisco
Television series by CBS Studios